These are the rosters of all participating teams at the men's water polo tournament at the 2012 Summer Olympics in London.

Pool A

The following is the Australian roster in the men's water polo tournament of the 2012 Summer Olympics.

Head coach: John Fox

The following is the Croatian roster in the men's water polo tournament of the 2012 Summer Olympics.

Head coach: Ratko Rudić

The following is the Greek roster in the men's water polo tournament of the 2012 Summer Olympics.

Head coach: Dragan Andrić

The following is the Italian roster in the men's water polo tournament of the 2012 Summer Olympics.

Head coach: Alessandro Campagna

The following is the Kazakh roster in the men's water polo tournament of the 2012 Summer Olympics.

Head coach: Sergey Drozdov

The following is the Spanish roster in the men's water polo tournament of the 2012 Summer Olympics.

Head coach: Rafael Aguilar

Pool B

The following is the British roster in the men's water polo tournament of the 2012 Summer Olympics.

Head coach: Cristian Iordache

The following is the Hungarian roster in the men's water polo tournament of the 2012 Summer Olympics.

Head coach: Dénes Kemény

The following is the Montenegrin roster in the men's water polo tournament of the 2012 Summer Olympics.

Head coach: Ranko Perović

The following is the Romanian roster in the men's water polo tournament of the 2012 Summer Olympics.

Head coach: István Kovács

The following is the Serbian roster in the men's water polo tournament of the 2012 Summer Olympics.

Head coach: Dejan Udovičić

The following is the American roster in the men's water polo tournament of the 2012 Summer Olympics.

Head coach: Terry Schroeder

See also
Water polo at the 2012 Summer Olympics – Women's team rosters

References

External links
Official website

Men's team rosters
2012